Rondón is a town and municipality in the Márquez Province, part of Boyacá Department, Colombia. Rondón borders Viracachá and Siachoque in the north, Zetaquirá and Ramiriquí in the south, Pesca in the east and Ramiriquí and Ciénega in the west.

Etymology 

Previously, Rondón was called San Rafael. In earlier times, the area of Rondón was known as a forested terrain called La Galera. It received the name Rondón honouring the independence hero of the Battle of Vargas Swamp Juan José Rondón.

History 
The terrain of Rondón was completely forested until the mid 19th century, when the lands passed through various families of land owners. The newly founded settlement was populated by people coming from Ramiriquí, Ciénega, Viracachá and Pesca. The town received the status of municipality on June 30, 1904, by Ignacio Aristides Medina Ávila.

Economy 
Main economical activities in Rondón are livestock farming and agriculture. Among the products cultivated are lulo, sugarcane, coffee, bananas, oranges, yuca, arracacha, beans, peas, avocadoes, guayaba, chirimoya, guanábana, potatoes and maize.

References 

Municipalities of Boyacá Department
Populated places established in 1905
1905 establishments in Colombia
Muisca Confederation